St. Mark's Methodist Church or St. Mark Methodist Church may refer to:

 St. Mark Methodist Church (Atlanta, Georgia), listed on the NRHP in Fulton County, Georgia
 St. Mark's Methodist Church (Brookline, Massachusetts), listed on the NRHP in Massachusetts
 St. Mark's Methodist Church, New York City